Timothy John Ryan (born July 16, 1973) is an American politician who served as a U.S. representative for Ohio from 2003 to 2023. A member of the Democratic Party, he represented  from 2013 to 2023 and represented  until redistricting. Ryan's district included a large swath of northeastern Ohio, from Youngstown to Akron. He was the Democratic nominee in the 2022 United States Senate election in Ohio.

Born in Niles, Ohio, Ryan worked as an aide to U.S. Representative Jim Traficant after studying political science at Bowling Green State University, and earned a J.D. degree from the University of New Hampshire School of Law. He served in the Ohio Senate from 2001 to 2002 before winning the election to succeed Traficant.

In November 2016, Ryan launched an unsuccessful challenge to unseat Nancy Pelosi as party leader of the House Democrats. He was also a candidate for the 2020 Democratic presidential nomination before ending his campaign in 2019 to run for reelection. Ryan was reelected to his tenth term in 2020. In 2021, Ryan announced his candidacy for Ohio's Senate seat and won the Democratic nomination with 70% of the vote. He lost to Republican nominee J. D. Vance in the November 8, 2022, general election.

Early life and career
Ryan was born in Niles, Ohio, the son of Rochelle Maria (Rizzi) and Allen Leroy Ryan; he is of Irish and Italian ancestry. Ryan's parents divorced when he was seven years old, and Ryan was raised by his mother. Ryan graduated from John F. Kennedy High School in Warren, where he played football as a quarterback and coached junior high basketball. He was recruited to play football at Youngstown State University, but a knee injury ended his playing career and he transferred to Bowling Green State University.

Ryan received a Bachelor of Arts degree in political science from Bowling Green in 1995 and was a member of Delta Tau Delta fraternity. After college, he joined the staff of Ohio Congressman Jim Traficant. In 2000, Ryan earned a Juris Doctor degree from Franklin Pierce Law Center in Concord, New Hampshire. From 2000 to 2002 he served half a term in the Ohio State Senate.

U.S. House of Representatives

Elections

After Jim Traficant was convicted on criminal charges in 2002, Ryan declared his candidacy for the 17th district. As the result of redistricting following the 2000 census, the 17th, which had long been based in Youngstown, had been pushed west and included much of Portage County and part of Akron. Before the redistricting, all of Akron had been part of the 14th district, represented by eight-term Democrat Tom Sawyer. The 14th had been eliminated in 2000; most of it was drawn into the 13th district of fellow Democrat Sherrod Brown, but Sawyer's home was drawn into the 17th. Ryan was initially seen as an underdog in a six-way Democratic primary that included Sawyer.

In the 2002 Democratic primary, Ryan defeated Sawyer, who was seen as insufficiently labor-friendly in the newly drawn district. In the November 2002 general election, he faced Republican Insurance Commissioner Ann Womer Benjamin as well as Traficant, who ran as an independent from his prison cell. Ryan won with 51% of the vote to Benjamin's 37%. When he took office in January 2003, he was the youngest Democrat in the House, at 29 years of age. He was reelected to represent the 17th district five times, only once facing a contest nearly as close as his first. In 2010, he was held to 53% of the vote; Traficant, running as an independent, took 16%.

Since redistricting in 2012, he has served five terms as the U.S. representative for the 13th district.

Tenure

In his first year in office in 2003, Ryan was one of seven members of Congress to vote against the Do-Not-Call Implementation Act, and one of eight to oppose ratification of the Federal Trade Commission's establishment of a National Do Not Call Registry.

In 2010, Ryan voted for the Stupak Amendment restricting federal funding for abortions, but in January 2015, he announced that having "gained a deeper understanding of the complexities and emotions that accompany the difficult decisions [about whether to end a pregnancy]" over his time in public office, he had reversed his position on abortion and now identified as pro-choice.

In 2010, Ryan introduced the Currency Reform for Fair Trade Act, which sought punitive trade tariffs on countries, notably China, that were engaging in currency manipulation. It passed the House overwhelmingly but never made it to the floor in the Senate. In an October 2010 interview with conservative magazine Human Events, Ryan said tax increases on small businesses were necessary "because we have huge deficits. We gotta shore up Social Security. We gotta shrink our deficits".

Ryan initiated a bid to replace Pelosi as House Minority Leader on November 17, 2016, prompted by colleagues after the 2016 presidential election. After Pelosi agreed to give more leadership opportunities to junior members, she defeated Ryan by a vote of 134–63 on November 30.

Ryan supported the Iran nuclear deal to prevent Iran from acquiring weapons of mass destruction. In April 2016, he tweeted, "I was in Jerusalem a few weeks ago & saw firsthand the dangerous threat Israelis face. Israel has the right to defend itself from terror."

Around 2018, Ryan helped Adi Othman, an undocumented immigrant in Youngstown, Ohio, remain in the United States. Othman had lived in the United States for nearly 40 years, ran several businesses in Youngstown, was married to a US citizen and had four US-born children. Ryan repeatedly presented a bill to Congress whereby Othman would be granted a more thorough review of his case to stay in the United States (Othman disputed a verdict by immigration officials on a matter that affected his legal status); the fact that the bill was in motion meant that Othman could temporarily stay. Othman was deported from the United States in February 2018 after President Donald Trump directed U.S. Immigration and Customs Enforcement (ICE) to increase the number of arrests and deportations of undocumented immigrants. Ryan condemned the deportation, saying, "To watch these families get ripped apart is the most heart-breaking thing any American citizen could ever see ... Because you are for these families, it doesn't mean you are not for a secure border."

Ryan chaired the Subcommittee on the Legislative Branch, which investigated the January 6 United States Capitol attack. In May 2021, Ryan angrily chastised Senate Republicans for blocking a January 6 commission to investigate the January 6 United States Capitol attack.

Committee assignments

 Committee on Appropriations
Subcommittee on the Legislative Branch (chair)
Subcommittee on Defense
Subcommittee on Military Construction, Veterans Affairs, and Related Agencies

Caucus memberships
 Co-chair of the Congressional Addiction, Treatment and Recovery Caucus
 Co-chair of the Congressional Manufacturing Caucus
 United States Congressional International Conservation Caucus
 Sportsmen's Caucus
 Congressional Arts Caucus
 Ohio River Basin Congressional Caucus
 Afterschool Caucuses
Medicare for All Caucus
Blue Collar Caucus
 House Pro-Choice Caucus

2020 presidential campaign

After the 2018 midterms, Ryan was seen as a possible candidate for the 2020 presidential election. In February and March 2019, he traveled to early primary states such as Iowa and New Hampshire. Ryan's 2020 presidential campaign officially began on April 4, 2019, when he announced his candidacy in the Democratic primaries. He also announced that he would seek the nomination on The View. After qualifying for only two debates and continuously polling below 1% nationwide, Ryan formally withdrew from the race on October 24, 2019. He was reelected to the House of Representatives in 2020.

2022 U.S. Senate election 

On January 25, 2021, Republican U.S. Senator from Ohio Rob Portman announced that he would not seek reelection in 2022. Ryan filed paperwork to run to replace him. On April 26, 2021, Ryan announced his candidacy for U.S. Senate in a video posted via Twitter.

Ryan defeated Morgan Harper and Traci Johnson in the Democratic primary and faced Republican nominee J. D. Vance in the general election. In pursuit of center-right voters, Ryan's campaign sought to portray him as a moderate or "independent", highlighting that he voted for some of former President Donald Trump's policies. Ryan also criticized and distanced himself from fellow Democrats, including President Joe Biden, suggesting that Biden should not seek reelection in 2024, and progressive Representative Alexandria Ocasio Cortez, whose endorsement he seemingly rejected.

A Ryan campaign ad, repeatedly blaming China for the loss of American jobs, attracted criticism from politicians and Asian American groups, who said it encouraged Sinophobia and anti-Asian hate. Representative Grace Meng called on Ryan to stop airing it.

On November 8, 2022, Ryan lost to Vance in the general election by 6 points.

Political views 

Ryan is an advocate of economic protectionism, unionization, and steps to reduce income inequality. A critic of the North American Free Trade Agreement (NAFTA), he has criticized George W. Bush's and Barack Obama's trade policies.

Ryan has supported tougher measures against China and its ruling party. He has accused the nation of currency manipulation and outsourcing American manufacturing jobs.

Publications
In March 2012, Hay House published Ryan's A Mindful Nation, a book about the practice of mindfulness in both private and public life. He writes in his introduction:  In October 2014, the same publisher published Ryan's The Real Food Revolution.

Personal life
In 2013, Ryan married Andrea Zetts, his second wife; they have lived in Howland Township near Warren, Ohio, since that year, with Zetts's two children from a previous relationship and the couple's son together.

Electoral history

See also
 List of United States representatives from Ohio
 30 Something Working Group

References

External links

 
 

|-

|-

|-

1973 births
21st-century American politicians
American people of Italian descent
American people of Irish descent
Bowling Green State University alumni
Candidates in the 2020 United States presidential election
Candidates in the 2022 United States Senate elections
Democratic Party members of the United States House of Representatives from Ohio
Democratic Party Ohio state senators
Ohio lawyers
Left-wing populism in the United States
Living people
People from Niles, Ohio
People from Warren, Ohio
University of New Hampshire School of Law alumni